Reflexões de um Liquidificador (Reflections of a Blender) is a 2010 Brazilian black comedy film directed by André Klotzel.

Plot
The film follows the story of Elvira, a housewife with a busy lifestyle. Onofre, her husband, disappeared, and she decides to go to the police to find out about his disappearance. The trajectory of the couple is narrated by Elvira's blender, which came to life when, long ago, Onofre switched its propeller for a much larger one.

Cast
Selton Mello as the blender
Ana Lúcia Torre as Elvira
Germano Haiut as Onofre
Gorete Milagres as Nurse Teresa
Marcos Cesana as postman
Aramis Trindade as Fuinha

Production and release
Reflexões de um Liquidificador commenced to be shot in August 2008 in São Paulo. To attract a bigger public than other Brazilian films of 2010 which had less than 10,000 attendance, Klotzel released it as a road show. It was not a success but grossed R$179,521, and an audience of 24,149 people, while other domestic releases did not achieve 100 viewers. It also guaranteed Klotzel the Best Director Award at the Brazilian Film & Television Festival of Toronto.

References

External links
  
 

Brazilian black comedy films
Films shot in São Paulo
Films set in São Paulo
2010 black comedy films
2010 films
2010s Portuguese-language films